The 2022 Pittsburgh Panthers football team represented the University of Pittsburgh as a member of the Coastal Division of the Atlantic Coast Conference (ACC) during the 2022 NCAA Division I FBS football season. The Panthers were led by eighth-year head coach Pat Narduzzi and played their home games at Acrisure Stadium in Pittsburgh. This was Pitt's tenth season as a member of the ACC.

Previous season 

The Panthers finished the 2021 season with an 11–3 record, and a 7–1 conference record. Pitt won the Coastal Division of the ACC. The Panthers won their first ever ACC Championship with a win over Wake Forest, 45–21. Pitt lost their bowl game, the Peach Bowl, against Michigan State 31–21 to end the season.

Offseason

2022 NFL Draft

Pitt players drafted into the NFL

Undrafted NFL free agents

Recruiting class 
The Panthers have signed a total of 12 student-athletes on Early National Signing Day (December 2021)

Recruits

Position key

Transfers

Incoming

Schedule

Game summaries

vs. West Virginia

vs. No. 24 Tennessee

at Western Michigan

vs. No. 20 (FCS) Rhode Island

vs. Georgia Tech

vs. Virginia Tech

at Louisville

at No. 21 North Carolina

vs. No. 20 Syracuse

at Virginia

vs. Duke

at Miami (FL)

vs UCLA (2022 Sun Bowl)

Rankings

Coaching staff

References

Pittsburgh
Pittsburgh Panthers football seasons
Sun Bowl champion seasons
Pittsburgh Panthers football